Consort Qing may refer to:

Imperial Noble Consort Qinggong (1724–1774), concubine of the Qianlong Emperor
Consort Qing (Xianfeng) (1840–1885), concubine of the Xianfeng Emperor